Paul Michael Bolland (born 13 March 1965) is a British former field hockey player.

He competed with the Great Britain squad at the 1992 Summer Olympics in Barcelona, and won silver with the England squad at the 1986 Hockey World Cup in London.

He was born in Weston-super-Mare, England.

References

External links
 
 

1965 births
Living people
British male field hockey players
Olympic field hockey players of Great Britain
Field hockey players at the 1992 Summer Olympics
Loughborough Students field hockey players
1990 Men's Hockey World Cup players